Ashleigh Barty defeated Karolína Plíšková in the final, 6–3, 6–7(4–7), 6–3 to win the ladies' singles tennis title at the 2021 Wimbledon Championships. She became the first Australian to win the title since Evonne Goolagong Cawley in 1980, the first top seed to win the title since Serena Williams in 2016 and the first to do so at any major since Simona Halep at the 2018 French Open. Barty's victory made her the fourth player, following Ann Jones, Martina Hingis and Amélie Mauresmo, to win the women's singles title after previously winning the girls' singles title. She retained the WTA No. 1 singles ranking by reaching the semifinals, with Aryna Sabalenka having also been in contention for the top ranking.

Halep was the reigning champion from when the tournament was last held in 2019, but she withdrew from the competition due to a calf injury.

Serena Williams retired from her first-round match against Aliaksandra Sasnovich due to injury. This marked only the second time that she lost in the first round of a major, following her defeat at the 2012 French Open to Virginie Razzano. It marked the first time since 2014 that the Wimbledon final did not feature one of the Williams sisters, as Venus Williams lost to Ons Jabeur in the second round, as well as the first time since 1997 that neither sister progressed beyond the second round.

This was the first edition of Wimbledon since 2009 that saw the top two seeds progress to the semifinals. Additionally, this was the first major in the Open Era where two wildcards, Liudmila Samsonova and Emma Raducanu (who made her first major appearance overall), reached the fourth round. Raducanu became the youngest British woman to reach the fourth round at Wimbledon in the Open Era. Jabeur became the first Tunisian player and the first Arabian woman in history to reach the quarterfinals at Wimbledon.

Seeds

Draw

Finals

Top half

Section 1

Section 2

Section 3

Section 4

Bottom half

Section 5

Section 6

Section 7

Section 8

Championship match statistics

Seeded players
The following are the seeded players. Seedings are based on WTA rankings as of 21 June 2021. Rankings and points are as of 28 June 2021.

†The player did not qualify for the tournament in 2019. Accordingly, points for her 16th best result are deducted instead.

Withdrawn players 
The following players would have been seeded, but withdrew before the tournament began.

Other entry information

Wild card entries
The following players were awarded wild cards into the main draw.

Qualifiers

Lucky losers

Protected ranking

Withdrawals
Before the tournament

During the tournament
  Lesia Tsurenko → replaced by  Astra Sharma

See also
2021 Wimbledon Championships – Day-by-day summaries

References

External links
 Ladies' Singles draw
2021 Wimbledon Championships – Women's draws and results at the International Tennis Federation

Women's Singles
Wimbledon Championship by year – Women's singles